Borophagus ("gluttonous eater") is an extinct genus of the subfamily Borophaginae, a group of canids endemic to North America from the Middle Miocene epoch through the Early Pleistocene epoch 12—1.8 Mya.

Evolution
Borophagus, like other borophagines, are loosely known as "bone-crushing" or "hyena-like" dogs. Though not the most massive borophagine by size or weight, it had a more highly evolved capacity to crunch bone than earlier, larger genera such as Epicyon, which seems to be an evolutionary trend of the group (Turner, 2004). During the Pliocene epoch, Borophagus began being displaced by other Canid species such as Canis edwardii and later by Aenocyon dirus. Early species of Borophagus were placed in the genus Osteoborus until recently, but the genera are now considered synonyms.

Description
Typical features of this genus are a bulging forehead and powerful jaws; Borophagus has been considered to be probably a scavenger by paleontologists in the past. Its crushing premolar teeth and strong jaw muscles would have been used to crack open bone, much like the hyena of the Old World. However, Borophagus fossils are so abundant and geographically widespread that some paleontologists now argue that Borophagus must have been both the dominant carnivore of its time, and thus an active predator because carrion feeding alone could not have sustained such a large population. They note that not all carnivores with bone-cracking ability are scavengers, such as the modern spotted hyena; instead, they interpret the bone-cracking ability as an adaptation to social hunting where complete utilization of a carcass was favored. Coprolites from Borophagus further vindicate its bone-crushing abilities, while simultaneously indicating it occupied a niche no longer seen in the present-day ecosystems of North America. The discovery of these coprolites also indicates that Borophagus may have been a social pack-hunter.  

The adult animal is estimated to have been about 80 cm in length, similar to a coyote, although it was much more powerfully built.

Species
 
Borophagus dudleyi existed for 
Osteoborus diabloensis)
Borophagus orc existed for 
Borophagus parvus existed for 
Existence based on Figure 141 of Wang et al. (1999).

Paleoecology
In North America, in places such as Coffee Ranch in Texas, Borophagus was contemporary with the bear Agriotherium as well as the feliform Barbourofelis, the saber-toothed machairodont cat Amphimachairodus coloradensis and fellow canid Epicyon. All of these animals were potential competitors that would have occasionally conflicted with Borophagus for food and territory, though it may also have readily scavenged their kills. Prey for Borophagus included herbivores like the camel Aepycamelus, the pronghorn antelope Cosoryx, horses like Neohipparion and Nannippus, the ancient peccary Prosthennops and even rhinoceroses like the hippo-like Teleoceras, all of which could provide a suitable meal through hunting or scavenging.

References 

Alan Turner, "National Geographic:  Prehistoric Mammals" (Washington, D.C.:  Firecrest Books Ltd., 2004), pp. 112–114.  
Xiaoming Wang, "The Origin and Evolution of the Dog Family"  Accessed 1/30/06.

Further reading

Picture of an Osteoborus skull in a museum, from "World of the Wolf."  (Accessed 6/19/06)
Russell Hunt, "Ecological Polarities Of the North American Family Canidae: A New Approach to Understanding Forty Million Years of Canid Evolution" (Accessed 1/30/06).
Wang et al., "Phylogenetic Systematics of the Borophaginae (Carnivora:Canidae)."  Bulletin of the American Museum of Natural History, No. 243, Nov. 17 1999. (PDF) (Accessed 4/11/06)
Xiaoming Wang, Richard H. Tedford, Mauricio Antón, Dogs: Their Fossil Relatives and Evolutionary History, New York : Columbia University Press, 2008; 

Borophagines
Miocene canids
Pliocene carnivorans
Neogene mammals of North America
Prehistoric carnivoran genera
Fossil taxa described in 1892